Andrée or Andree may refer to:

People
 Andrée (given name)
 Andree (surname)

Places
 Andree, Minnesota, unincorporated community in Stanchfield Township, Isanti County, Minnesota
 1296 Andrée, asteroid
 Andrée Land (Svalbard)
 Andrée Land (Greenland)
 Mount Andree, Heard Island
 Andrée Island, Antarctica

See also
 Andre (disambiguation)

de:Andree
fr:Andrée
nl:Andrée
sv:Andrée